George Elliott (died July 1844) was an Irish-born farmer and political figure in Upper Canada. He represented Durham in the Legislative Assembly of Upper Canada from 1836 to 1841 as a Conservative.

Elliott lived in Monaghan Township. He was a captain and then major in the Durham militia and also served as a justice of the peace for the Newcastle District. Elliott was an Anglican. He died in Monghan Township.

References 

Year of birth missing
1844 deaths
Members of the Legislative Assembly of Upper Canada
Canadian justices of the peace